Spectrunculus grandis is a species of Rhizopharyngia ray-finned fish in the cusk-eel family known by the common names pudgy cusk-eel and giant cusk-eel. It is one of two species in the formerly monotypic genus Spectrunculus, the other species, S. crassus, having been differentiated in 2008.

The pudgy cusk-eel is a common fish of deep oceans worldwide. It is bathydemersal, living along the ocean floor most often at depths between 2000 and 3000 metres, and known from waters as deep as 4800 metres. It is one of the largest bony fishes living below 2000 meters, reaching up to 127 centimetres in length. The male is larger than the female and darker in colour. It has a long, laterally compressed body and a rounded snout with a single fleshy anterior nostril in front of a flat posterior nostril. The fish varies in coloration from pale with white fins to light brown to dark brown; individuals from the Atlantic Ocean are often pale while Pacific Ocean specimens are usually darker.

The fish is oviparous, the eggs floating in masses.

References

External links
 

Ophidiidae
Fish described in 1877
Taxa named by Albert Günther